Tomás Osvaldo González Morales (20 April 1935 – 12 February 2022) was a Chilean Roman Catholic bishop.

Biography
González Morales was born in Chile on 20 April 1935. He was ordained to the priesthood in 1963, before serving as bishop of the Roman Catholic Diocese of Punta Arenas, Chile, from 1974 until his retirement in 2006.

González Morales died from COVID-19 in Punta Arenas on 12 February 2022, at the age of 86, during the COVID-19 pandemic in Chile.

References

1935 births
2022 deaths
20th-century Roman Catholic bishops in Chile
21st-century Roman Catholic bishops in Chile
Deaths from the COVID-19 pandemic in Chile
People from Punta Arenas
Roman Catholic bishops of Punta Arenas